Mark Proctor (born 23 December 1988 in Stoke-on-Trent) is a British slalom canoeist who competed at the international level from 2004 to 2016.

He won a bronze medal in the C2 team event at the 2015 ICF Canoe Slalom World Championships in London.

References

External links 
 Mark PROCTOR at CanoeSlalom.net

1993 births
English male canoeists
Living people
Medalists at the ICF Canoe Slalom World Championships